Mysterious Phonk: Chronicles of SpaceGhostPurrp is the debut studio album by American hip hop musician SpaceGhostPurrp. It was released by 4AD on June 12, 2012.

Critical reception

At Metacritic, which assigns a weighted average score out of 100 to reviews from mainstream critics, the album received an average score of 69% based on 20 reviews, indicating "generally favorable reviews".

Ian Cohen of Pitchfork gave the album an 8.0 out of 10, saying, "even if these tracks aren't familiar to you from previous mixtapes, each asserts itself largely with same qualities that have defined 4AD's roster since the beginning: mesmerizing use of reverb and negative space, hooks derived from the phonetic and rhythmic qualities of words rather than their meaning, constructions of alternate realities." This album has a dark and melodic theme that has influenced many modern day albums.

Track listing

Charts

References

External links
 

2012 debut albums
4AD albums
SpaceGhostPurrp albums